Guangdong-Hong Kong Cup 2002–03 is the 25th staging of this two-leg competition between Hong Kong and Guangdong.

The first leg was played in Guangzhou while the second leg was played in Hong Kong.

Guangzhou captured the champion by winning an aggregate 4–1 against Hong Kong.

Rules
 Each team was allowed to register a maximum of 5 foreign players, among which only 3 of them could be played in the match at the same time.

Squads

Hong Kong
  Fan Chun Yip
  Chung Ho Yin
  Cheung Yiu Lun
  Leung Chi Wing
  Chan Wai Ho
  Cristiano Cordeiro
  Ng Wai Chiu
  Poon Yiu Cheuk
  Cheung Sai Ho
  Kim Pan-Gon
  Lo Chi Kwan
  Lee Wai Man
  Man Pei Tak
  Lee Kin Wo
  Cornelius Udebuluzor
  Chan Ho Man
  Au Wai Lun
  Rochy Putiray
  Chan Chi Hong
  Keith Gumbs
  Szeto Man Chun
  Gerard Ambassa Guy
  Márcio Gabriel Anacleto

Guangdong
The team was formed mainly by players from Jia A 2002 1st runner-up Shenzhen Kejian Pingan. It also invited 4 players from Jia A champion team Dalian Shide. 
Some of the players in the squad include:
  Chen Yongqiang
  Ji Mingyi (from Dalian)
  Li Fei
  Li Jianhua
  Li Ming (from Dalian)
  Li Yi (captain)
  Liu Jian
  Sun Gang
  Wang Hongwei
  Wang Peng (from Dalian)
  Wen Guanghui
  Yang Guang
  Yuan Lin
  Zhang Xinxin
  Zheng Zhi
  Zheng Bin
  Zou Jie (from Dalian)

Results
First Leg

Second Leg

Trivia
 Dalian Shide players Wang Peng and Zou Jie were top scorers in AFC Youth Championship 2002.
 Zheng Zhi only played for the second match. He was the Jia A 2002 Player of the Year.

References
 HKFA website 近5屆省港盃回顧(一) (in chinese)

 

2002
2003 in Chinese football
2002 in Chinese football
2002–03 in Hong Kong football